Spanish Ranch may refer to:

Spanish Ranch, California
Spanish Ranch Creek